A troop command is a command equivalent in size to a brigade that provides command and control headquarters and planning staff for smaller units of a National Guard within a state that are not organized under a division or brigade headquarters. Troop commands typically provide logistical and administrative support for non-organic units deploying MTOE in the district that are not structured under another formation headquarters. They also provide administrative support to units from other formations within their respective state that are stationed a long way from their higher headquarters.

Troop commands

References

Numbered commands of the United States Army